Lawrence John Rosenthal (May 21, 1910 – March 4, 1992) was a professional baseball outfielder in the 1930s and 1940s. He first played with the Chicago White Sox in 1936, and hit .281 in 317 at bats. He actually started out spectacularly, getting on base three or more times in 19 of his first 50 games, two more than the next four players, who include Joe DiMaggio. He played with the White Sox until 1941, when he was purchased by the Cleveland Indians. He then spent two years in the minor leagues, returning to the majors in 1944. Rosenthal played poorly, and never had much playing time afterward, although he played briefly for the New York Yankees and Philadelphia Athletics.

Rosenthal is second all-time (Jeremy Giambi) for most walks with fewer than 1500 career 
ABs.

References 

1910 births
1992 deaths
Chicago White Sox players
Cleveland Indians players
New York Yankees players
Philadelphia Athletics players
Major League Baseball outfielders
Baseball players from Saint Paul, Minnesota